Jouni Tapani ("Tapsa") Haapakoski (born 14 June 1953 in Ylivieska, Oulu) is a retired Finnish pole vaulter.

He became Finnish champion in 1976.

His personal best jump was 5.55 metres, achieved in July 1980 in Raahe.

Achievements

References

1953 births
Living people
People from Ylivieska
Finnish male pole vaulters
Athletes (track and field) at the 1976 Summer Olympics
Athletes (track and field) at the 1980 Summer Olympics
Olympic athletes of Finland
Sportspeople from North Ostrobothnia